Johnnie Maitland (3 December 1914 – 18 January 1988) was an Australian sports shooter. He competed in the 25 metre pistol event at the 1956 Summer Olympics.

References

External links
 

1914 births
1988 deaths
Australian male sport shooters
Olympic shooters of Australia
Shooters at the 1956 Summer Olympics
People from Goulburn
Sportsmen from New South Wales
20th-century Australian people